Lien Huyghebaert (born 31 August 1982) is a Belgian sprinter, who specializes in the 100 metres.

Huyghebaert finished sixth in 4 x 100 metres relay at the 2004 Summer Olympics, with teammates Katleen De Caluwé, Élodie Ouédraogo and Kim Gevaert. This team set a national record of 43.08 seconds in the heat.

Her personal best time is 11.49 seconds, achieved in July 2004 in Brussels.

References

1982 births
Living people
Belgian female sprinters
Athletes (track and field) at the 2004 Summer Olympics
Olympic athletes of Belgium
World Athletics Championships athletes for Belgium
Place of birth missing (living people)
Olympic female sprinters